Mamia I Dadiani (died 1345) was a member of the House of Dadiani and eristavi ("duke") of Odishi in western Georgia from 1323 until his death.

Mamia succeeded as duke of Odishi, latter-day Mingrelia, on the death of his father, Giorgi I Dadiani, in 1323. This was the time when a civil war was raging in the Kingdom of Imereti, of which Odishi was part, between King Constantine and his brother Michael. According to the early-18th-century historian Prince Vakhushti, this situation was exploited by Giorgi I Dadiani to assert the Dadiani's autonomy, which was further consolidated by Mamia I. By that time, he held sway not only over Odishi proper; his influence extended south into Guria and north into Abkhazia. In 1330, however, Imereti and its vassal principalities were reintegrated by the resurgent King of Georgia, George V "the Brilliant", to whom Dadiani offered his submission. Mamia died in 1345 and his son, Giorgi II was confirmed by the king of Georgia as his successor.

References 

1345 deaths
14th-century people from Georgia (country)
House of Dadiani